Geissanthus challuayacus is a species of plant in the family Primulaceae. It is endemic to Ecuador.

References

challuayacus
Endemic flora of Ecuador
Vulnerable plants
Taxonomy articles created by Polbot